Riff Raff, Riffraff, or Riff-Raff, a term for the common people but with negative connotations, may refer to:

In music

 Riff Raff (rapper), from Texas
 Riff Raff (band), a UK progressive rock band
 Riff Raff, a band formed by Billy Bragg
 Riff Raff (British magazine), a London-based monthly rock magazine
 Riff Raff (album), by Dave Edmunds
 "Riff Raff", an organ piece by Giles Swayne
 "Riff Raff", a song by the band AC/DC, from their album, Powerage

Films

 Riffraff (1936 film), an American drama starring Jean Harlow and Spencer Tracy
 Riff-Raff (1947 film), a black-and-white film noir featuring Pat O'Brien
 Riff-Raff (1991 film), a British film
 Riff Raff, a Laurence Fishburne play from which the 2000 film Once in the Life was adapted

Fictional characters

 Riff Raff (cat), an alley cat in the animated series The Catillac Cats
 Riff Raff (hunchback), in the musical play The Rocky Horror Show and film The Rocky Horror Picture Show
 Riff Raff (Underdog), on the television series Underdog

See also

Riff (disambiguation)